Tommie L. Pierson Jr. (born 1973) is an American pastor and politician who served as a Democratic member of the Missouri House of Representatives from 2017 to 2021. He represented the 66th district, which covers parts of St. Louis County and the city of St. Louis.

Early life and education
Pierson is the son of Tommie Pierson, a former state representative. He graduated from Parkway North High School in 1991 and from Washington University in St. Louis in 1995. Pierson received a Master of Arts from Covenant Theological Seminary in 2009.

Career 
Pierson is the pastor of the InStep Church in St. Charles, Missouri.

When his father vacated his legislative seat in order to run for Lieutenant Governor of Missouri, the younger Pierson announced he would run for the seat. Pierson prevailed in a three-way Democratic primary and defeated Republican John Saxton in the general election.

In 2019, he was elected assistant floor leader for the Democratic party in the Missouri House of Representatives.

Personal life
Pierson and his wife, Zorata, have three children: Tamia, Carlton, and Thaddeus.

Electoral history

State Representative

State Senate

References

External links
 Campaign website
 Legislative website

1973 births
Living people
African-American Christian clergy
African-American state legislators in Missouri
American Christian clergy
Covenant Theological Seminary alumni
Democratic Party members of the Missouri House of Representatives
People from St. Louis County, Missouri
Politicians from St. Louis
Washington University in St. Louis alumni
21st-century American politicians